The Speed of Love  is the third solo album by Tammy Rogers, released April 6, 1999. Jason Ankeny's biography of Tammy Rogers on AllMusic mentions that she was a member of Patty Loveless' backing band, which she followed with a stint backing Trisha Yearwood before becoming one of the first members of Kieran Kane's Dead Reckoning label.

Critical reception

Dan Williams of Country Standard Time concludes his review with, "This is sturdy and consistently listenable - an honest record that serves as a welcome antidote to the many freeze-dried ingenues spilling out of Music Row of late."

Eric Thom of Exclaim writes, "Nashville’s most in-demand session fiddle player not only unleashes her seasoned songwriting ability on this release, but she’ll lay your soul to waste with her angelic singing voice as well."

Track listing

Musicians
Tammy Rogers: Vocals, Fiddle, Mandolin, Melodica, Strings
Harry Stinson: Drums, Percussion, Vocals
Alison Prestwood: Electric Bass
Glenn Worf: Upright Bass
Jeff King: Electric Guitars, Acoustic Guitars
Pat Buchanan: Acoustic Guitars
Kieran Kane: Octave Mandolin, Acoustic Guitars
Dan Dugmore: Steel Guitar, Electric Guitar
Brian David Willis: Tambourine

Production
Recorded at Dead Aunt Thelma's, Nashville, Tennessee by Brian David Willis
Overdubs recorded at Way Out Wyoming, Nashville, Tennessee by Tammy Rogers and Jeff King
Mixed at Dead Aunt Thelma's by Young Brian

All track information and credits were verified from the CD liner notes. and from the official website for the album.

References

External links
Tammy Rogers Official Site
Dead Reckoning Records Official Site

1999 albums
Dead Reckoning Records albums